Robert Thomas O'Donnell (23 April 1870 – 20 March 1940) was an Australian rules footballer who played with South Melbourne in the Victorian Football League (VFL).

Notes

External links 

1870 births
1940 deaths
Australian rules footballers from Victoria (Australia)
Sydney Swans players